The 2015–16 Grand Canyon Antelopes men's basketball team represented Grand Canyon University during the 2015–16 NCAA Division I men's basketball season. This was head coach Dan Majerle's third season at Grand Canyon. This season was year 3 of a 4-year transition period from Division II to Division I. As a result, the Antelopes were not eligible to make the NCAA Tournament, nor the NIT and could not participate WAC Basketball Tournament. However the Antelopes were eligible for the CIT, CBI or the new Vegas 16 tournaments if invited. They finished the season 27–7, 11–3 in WAC play to finish in a tie for second place. They were invited to the CollegeInsider.com Tournament. In the first round, they defeated South Carolina State to be champions of the Coach John McLendon Classic, the first classic game to be held as part of a postseason tournament. In the second round they defeated Jackson State to advance to the quarterfinals where they lost to Coastal Carolina.

Previous season
The Antelopes finished the season 17–15, 8–6 in WAC play to finish in a tie for second place. They were invited to the CollegeInsider.com Tournament where they lost in the first round to Northern Arizona.

Departures

Incoming transfers

2015 incoming recruits

Roster

Schedule and results

|-
!colspan=12 style="background:#522D80; color:#FFFFFF;"| Exhibition

|-
!colspan=12 style="background:#522D80; color:#FFFFFF;"| Regular season

|-
!colspan=12 style="background:#522D80; color:#FFFFFF;"| CIT

References

Grand Canyon Antelopes men's basketball seasons
Grand Canyon
Grand Canyon
Grand Canyon Antelopes men's basketball
Grand Canyon Antelopes men's basketball